Mount Lindsey is a high mountain summit on the Sierra Blanca Massif in the Sangre de Cristo Range of the Rocky Mountains of North America.

Mountain
The summit and most of the southern flank of the mountain are privately held, but access to the summit is allowed. In 1954, the name was changed to honor Malcolm Lindsey, a beloved chaperone for the Juniors of the Colorado Mountain Club in the 1940s. Previously the mountain had been known as Old Baldy.

Historical names
Baldy
Mount Lindsey – 1954 
Old Baldy
Old Baldy Peak – 1906

See also

List of mountain peaks of Colorado
List of Colorado fourteeners

References

External links

 

Lindsey
Lindsey
Lindsey
Lindsey
Lindsey